In mathematics, in particular field theory, the conjugate elements or algebraic conjugates of an algebraic element , over a field extension , are the roots of the minimal polynomial  of  over . Conjugate elements are commonly called conjugates in contexts where this is not ambiguous.  Normally  itself is included in the set of conjugates of .

The equivalence of the two definitions is one of the starting points of Galois theory.

Example
The cube roots of the number one are:

 

Properties
If K is given inside an algebraically closed field C, then the conjugates can be taken inside C. If no such C is specified, one can take the conjugates in some relatively small field L. The smallest possible choice for L is to take a splitting field over K of pK,α, containing α. If L is any normal extension of K containing α, then by definition it already contains such a splitting field.

Given then a normal extension L of K, with automorphism group Aut(L/K) = G, and containing α, any element g(α) for g in G will be a conjugate of α, since the automorphism g sends roots of p to roots of p. Conversely any conjugate β of α is of this form: in other words, G acts transitively on the conjugates. This follows as K(α) is K-isomorphic to K(β) by irreducibility of the minimal polynomial, and any isomorphism of fields F and F that maps polynomial p to p can be extended to an isomorphism of the splitting fields of p over F and p over F, respectively.

In summary, the conjugate elements of α are found, in any normal extension L of K that contains K(α), as the set of elements g(α) for g in Aut(L/K). The number of repeats in that list of each element is the separable degree [L:K(α)]sep.

A theorem of Kronecker states that if α is a nonzero algebraic integer such that α and all of its conjugates in the complex numbers have absolute value at most 1, then α is a root of unity. There are quantitative forms of this, stating more precisely bounds (depending on degree) on the largest absolute value of a conjugate that imply that an algebraic integer is a  root of unity.

References
David S. Dummit, Richard M. Foote, Abstract algebra, 3rd ed., Wiley, 2004.

External links
 

Field (mathematics)